Acanthella is a genus of sponges in the family Dictyonellidae, which was first described in 1862 by Eduard Oscar Schmidt. The type species is  Acanthella acuta Schmidt, 1862 (designated by Vosmaer in 1912).

Species
According to the WoRMS database, accepted species are:
 Acanthella aculeata Thiele, 1898
 Acanthella acuta Schmidt, 1862
 Acanthella annulata Sarà, 1958
 Acanthella branchia Sim, Kim & Byeon, 1990
 Acanthella calyx Dendy, 1922
 Acanthella cavernosa Dendy, 1922
 Acanthella costata Kieschnick, 1900
 Acanthella cubensis (Alcolado, 1984)
 Acanthella danerii Costa, Bavestrello, Pansini & Bertolino, 2020
 Acanthella dendyi (Bergquist, 1970)
 Acanthella erecta (Carter, 1876)
 Acanthella flabellata (Tanita, 1961)
 Acanthella flagelliformis (van Soest & Stentoft, 1988)
 Acanthella gorgonoides (Thomas, 1984)
 Acanthella hispida Pulitzer-Finali, 1982
 Acanthella insignis Thiele, 1898
 Acanthella klethra Pulitzer-Finali, 1982
 Acanthella ligulata (Burton, 1928)
 Acanthella mastophora (Schmidt, 1870)
 Acanthella megaspicula Thomas, 1984
 Acanthella minuta Tanita, 1968
 Acanthella multiformis Vosmaer, 1885
 Acanthella oviforma Tanita & Hoshino, 1989
 Acanthella pulcherrima Ridley & Dendy, 1886
 Acanthella ramosa Kumar, 1925
 Acanthella ramus (Sim, Kim & Byeon, 1990)
 Acanthella simplex Thiele, 1898
 Acanthella stanleei Nascimento, Cavalcanti & Pinheiro, 2019
 Acanthella styloida Tanita & Hoshino, 1989
 Acanthella tenuispiculata Dendy, 1897
 Acanthella vaceleti van Soest & Stentoft, 1988
 Acanthella vulgata Thiele, 1898
 Acanthella xutha (de Laubenfels, 1954)

References 

Sponge genera
Taxa named by Eduard Oscar Schmidt
Demospongiae